The California Green Lodging Program is an initiative in California that encourages hotels in the state to save water and energy and reduce waste. It is run by the California Department of General Services. Hotels are evaluated on a set of environmental criteria and, depending how well these are satisfied, certificates ("palm trees") are awarded at two levels.

History
The Green Lodging Program was established in 2004.  California Integrated Waste Management Board first oversaw the Green Lodging Program, and then in late 2008 the Department of General Services took over.  This program was initially designed to assist state employees to select hotels that were conserving water and energy, diverting waste from landfills, and providing cleaner air while they were traveling.  Since then, the program has expanded to acknowledge and reward hotels that meet the guidelines to become a California green hotel.

Standards and recognition
In order for a hotel to be considered for entry into the Green Lodging Program, it needs to meet certain standards set by the state.  Within the California Green Lodging Program there are two levels of recognition: one palm tree is the participation level and two palm trees is the leadership level.  The participation level is the entry level.  This means the hotel may not have a written environmental policy in place, but within three years of their enrollment the hotel needs to show increased improvement so they can be bumped up to the leadership level.  The leadership level means the hotel has a written environmental policy in place and meets all the criteria for the program. The hotel is required to fill out a “hotel survey” that determines if they meet any of the palm tree levels.  The survey asks the individual hotels about the following criteria:
      Waste minimization, reuse and recycling
 Recycling programs; recycling receptacles; donating and composting of left-over food and landscape waste; purchasing amenities in smallest practical size.
 Energy efficiency, conservation and management
 Energy-efficient equipment; preventative maintenance schedule; sensors on HVAC systems; energy-efficient windows.
 Efficient lighting
 Energy-efficient lighting in areas lit for more than 8 hours a day; sensors/timers on lighting.
 Landscape and water conservation
 Use of trees and plans that tolerate climate, soil and water availability; watering is conducted at low sun times; use of soaker hoses; sidewalks and drives are swept and not watered; towel and linen exchange program for multiple night guests; policy for water temperature; faucets, showerheads and toilets are low-flow.
 Pest management
 Use of organic insecticides both indoors and outdoors.
 Hazardous and toxic substances
 At least half of the cleaning products and detergents are the least toxic available; products are biodegradable.
 Purchasing policies
 Appointment of a steering committee to oversee the environmental program; environmentally sound preferences are incorporated; consideration of life-cycle costs; uses products with different percentages of post-consumer recycled content based on the product; preferences are given to reusable or recyclable packaging.

Once this is returned to the state, Green Lodging staff conducts a field survey and a program evaluation. In order for the hotel to meet the participation level they must achieve a score between 250 and 300, whereas the leadership level requires a score above 300 points. Although much research has been conducted on the matter, there is little transparency in the evaluation and scoring process.  There is no fee to be involved in the program because it is non-regulatory and participation is voluntary. The state currently does not have a recertification process, but they are developing one.

Environmental problem 
There are many environmental problems this program attempts to solve.  Hotels continue to be large consumers of goods, produce large amounts of solid waste and use a considerable amount of natural resources.  According to Green Hotel Review’s website, a single hotel purchases more items in a week than one hundred families do in a year.  Each room within a hotel can produce thirty pounds of waste per day; of this nearly eighty percent can be recycled. Each year the lodging industry spends $3.7 billion a year on energy. Individual rooms consume 218 gallons of water per day and water-efficient fixtures can reduce this number by twenty-five to thirty percent.

After realizing these numbers, hotels can make a big impact on saving natural resources by just making a few changes. Southern California naturally has less water so planting native plants can assist in water conservation.

Background 
California has a major hospitality and tourism economy.  According to California’s Travel website (www.visitcalifornia.com), California had 335 million visitors in 2009 that spent approximately $87.8 billion.  California has the largest share of visitors in the U.S. domestic travel market.  A majority of the tourists choose to stay in middle to high-end hotels (40%), while only 19% stayed in private homes (this included people visiting friends and families).  The hotel industry employed 506,200 people in 2009.  Based on these numbers, the waste accumulated from hotels is far more than the average U.S. state.

Due to the negative physical externalities from the travel market, the state wanted to encourage more green behavior from the hotels.  In order to get involved in the green business trend, California began a program to promote hotels that were making environmentally friendly choices.  Economics has a concept of information asymmetry, which concludes that market inefficiencies occur when one party has more knowledge about a product, or industry, than another.  This can sometimes mean the seller has more information than the buyer, leading the seller to manipulate the buyer into purchasing more of something than is necessary.  With technology increasing, the likelihood of asymmetric information happening is declining.

By having a large number of tourists staying in upper-end hotels, the hotels could set themselves apart by “selling” the green amenities they offer.  Per the U.S. Green Building Council, the benefits of becoming green are: 8-9% operating cost decrease, 7.5% building value increase, 6.6% return on investment improves, 3.5% occupancy ration increases and 3% rent ration increases.  These are all enticing reasons for hotels to go green.  The Green Lodging Program utilized Kimpton Hotels as the launch hotel in 2004 (Environmental Evangelism, 2005).  This hotel is considered a luxury/boutique hotel that stressed environmental sensitivity.  Research conducted by Kuminoff, Zhang and Rudi found that travelers were willing to pay approximately $8.97 to $45.43 more to stay in a green hotel.  The Green Lodging Program is also a medium for advertising for the hotels.

Program solution 
The Green Lodging Program was initially designed to encourage government travelers to stay at environmentally friendly hotels.  Since then, hotels have used the program as a marketing tool to attract common travelers.  The California Green Lodging Program uses education as their tool to encourage participation.  This, in turn, allows the hotels to use it to their advantage to market to the public as a green hotel.  The program specifically targets hotels in California while also providing information to state and local government employees.  The Department of General Services (DGS) oversees the program.  The website declares their purpose as "help(ing) to better serve the public by providing a variety of services to state agencies through innovative procurement and acquisition solutions, creative real estate management and design, state-of-the-art telecommunications, environmentally friendly transportation, and funding for the construction of safe schools."

Gore discusses the concept of “green labeling” as a mechanism for limiting asymmetric information in the economic market.  “Full information about who is responsible for environmental damage will also be an increasingly important way to make market forces for the environment instead of against it.” If private companies and public agencies continue to educate people about the effects on the environment, then individuals will be equipped to make better choices, therefore helping the environment.  Gore is concerned that private businesses manipulate the green concept since there is no government regulation determining what the criteria are for considering products green.  The California Green Lodging Program addresses this by developing standards and a scoring system so that a common traveler can understand what a green hotel is.

Since this is a fairly new program, it has undergone few changes except for changes to the scoring mechanism.  As technology changes, the aspects that the hotels are scored against have to change.

Stakeholder analysis 
The stakeholders involved in the program are hotel owners, hotel board members, hotel employees, state and local government employees, general public, California’s Department of General Services, the Governor of California, and green product manufacturers.  The hotel owners and the board members have an interest in this program because it can boost their market population therefore increasing their business/profit.  The hotel employees will be given new job duties if the owners/board members decide to implement green procedures.  The state and local government employees along with the general public chose what hotels to stay in.
The Department of General Service’s mission is to serve the public through the state agencies with innovative and eco-friendly technology.  This mission is what the program wishes to accomplish.  The Governor improves his political image by encouraging hotels to be greener.  The last stakeholder is the green product manufacturer.  They have a lot of money invested in research and development for their products.  They only want to sell their products so this program is free marketing for them.  Manufacturers can motivate purchases by marketing them based on how they will help ensure compliance with and/or a higher rating in the program.

The behavior that the program is targeting to change is the purchasing habits of state and local government employees.  The California Green Lodging Program is also indirectly altering the hotels’ behavior toward environmentalism to be in line with what the customer wants.
The green material manufacturers market their products to hotels knowing that the hotels want to be friendlier to the earth.  Research shows that customers will pay more to stay in a greener hotel.  The following is an example taken from a presentation showing the benefits to hotels if they become green:

“Proven benefits of comprehensive green business actions:
 Enhanced loyalty and goodwill from guests and the community: People feel better about supporting companies that share their values.
 Improved morale and productivity of employees, who share these values: When team members are happy it’s easy making guests happy.
 Increased visibility as a leading company versus competition: Strengthens market differentiation and a unique selling proposition.
 Reduced operating costs through waste reduction and efficiency measures: Reinvesting these dollars strengthens the company and creates jobs.”

The California Department of General Services “Green Lodging Program” lists the hotels that have been distinguished on their website.  The hotels also promote this honor on their websites, which is additional marketing power that the hotels receive due to their effort to be green.

Evaluation 
In the research conducted, the program has not been evaluated.  This may be because the program does not have any income and has minor, if any, expenses.  Currently, there are 100 hotels in northern California and 150 in southern California that are listed on the Green Lodging Program database.  Out of 23,000 total hotels in California, only 250 hotels are recognized as being “green.” (CA Dept. of Finance & CA Dept. of General Services). Despite a 25 percent growth in 2019, the number of participating hotels has been declining for the past ten years, with currently half the number of hotels certified compared to 2009. The state of California has information on their website about coming up with new ideas on how to enhance the program, but no specifics.  Across the nation, other states have very recently implemented green lodging programs.  This will provide for California’s Green Lodging Program to be evaluated against other state programs and determine how they recognize green hotels.

Other hotels have published their savings by following “green” practices.  One hotel began cutting electricity usage and installed energy efficient fluorescent light bulbs since 1999 and has saved more than $585,000.  The Fairmont Royal in Toronto insisted on reducing the packaging that came with the products they regularly purchase.  By using a new product that was equivalent to 750 sheets of Bounce fabric softener, it saved the hotel from purchasing 23,000 sheets of Bounce.  By using water efficient appliances, hotels can expect to save 25-30 percent on their water and sewer bills.

The California Green Lodging Program is designed to promote green hotels to state and local government employees to stay at while traveling.  The hotel industry uses enormous amounts of resources and the program wants travelers to know that this is not how the industry has to be.  The program has two levels of distinction and the hotels simply apply and are evaluated.  The state publishes on their website which hotels meet the qualifications for all to see.  Hotels can use this distinction to their advantage for marketing and encourage all travelers to stay with them.  If the program continues to grow, more resources will be saved.

See also 
 Eco hotel

References 

 California Department of Finance. (2009). Retrieved from http://www.dof.ca.gov/

Environmental organizations based in California
Hotels in California